The 2001 edition of The Winston was held on May 19, 2001, at Lowe's Motor Speedway in Concord, North Carolina. This was the 17th running of the event. The race is mostly remembered for the start, when rain progressed onto the track, causing cars to get loose and crash into the wall. One of the first ones to crash was Kevin Harvick, in his first appearance at the speedway. Then Jeff Gordon got sideways and wrecked after tapping Jeff Burton from behind, then Michael Waltrip wrecked Gordon, destroying his car, at which point the race was stopped. All of the drivers returned with back-up cars. At the end, Gordon came across the line and won his third All-Star race, tying Dale Earnhardt. Drivers Johnny Benson and Todd Bodine advanced from The Winston Open, with Benson winning the Open and Bodine winning the No Bull 5 Sprint race. This was the first Winston event without Darrell Waltrip and Dale Earnhardt. Waltrip retired at the end of 2000 and called the 2001 race from the booth, and Earnhardt was killed earlier in the season at the Daytona 500. Both drivers competed in the first 16 events.

2001 The Winston drivers and eligibility 
1-Steve Park (2 wins from 2000 and 2001)
2-Rusty Wallace (5 wins from 2000 and 2001)
5-Terry Labonte (2 NASCAR Winston Cup Series titles in 1984 and 1996)
6-Mark Martin (1 win in 2000)
8-Dale Earnhardt Jr. (2 wins in 2000)
9-Bill Elliott (1988 NASCAR Winston Cup Series champion)
12-Jeremy Mayfield (2 wins in 2000)
15-Michael Waltrip (2001 Daytona 500 winner)
17-Matt Kenseth (1 win in 2000)
18-Bobby Labonte (2000 NASCAR Winston Cup Series champion)
20-Tony Stewart (7 wins from 2000 and 2001)
21-Elliott Sadler (Food City 500 winner)
22-Ward Burton (1 win in 2000)
24-Jeff Gordon (4 wins from 2000 and 2001)
25-Jerry Nadeau (1 win in 2000)
29-Kevin Harvick (Cracker Barrel Old Country Store 500 winner)
55-Bobby Hamilton (Talladega 500 winner)
88-Dale Jarrett (5 wins from 2000 and 2001)
99-Jeff Burton (4 wins in 2000)

The Winston Open/No Bull 5 Sprint 
Johnny Benson started on the pole and led the first 7 laps of the 30 lap Winston Open. After a caution for a single car accident by Stacy Compton on lap 3, part-time driver and second-place starter Ryan Newman passed Benson for the lead. Newman led most of the race until his engine blew with 2 laps to go, causing a caution. Johnny Benson would take the lead under caution, win the race, and advance to The Winston.

In the 16 lap No Bull 5 Sprint Race, Buckshot Jones got loose in turn one and touched Jason Leffler, who also spun. After crashing hard into the wall, Jones came down across the track into the path of 60-year-old driver Dave Marcis. Jones was seen wearing a HANS Device upon exiting his car. Marcis was making his final attempt at The Winston and all 3 drivers failed to finish the race. After the race restarted, Todd Bodine took the lead, held on to win and advance to the Winston.

The Winston Open top five results 

 10-Johnny Benson (advances to feature)
 28-Ricky Rudd
 32-Ricky Craven
 7-Mike Wallace
 77-Robert Pressley

No Bull 5 Sprint top five results 

 66-Todd Bodine (advances to feature)
 26-Jimmy Spencer
 77-Robert Pressley
 33-Bobby Hamilton, Jr.
 36-Ken Schrader

First lap mayhem 

At the start of the race, pole sitter Rusty Wallace led off the green flag when rain was starting to fall at the track. Then Kevin Harvick, the third car in line, got loose and hit the wall in turn one. Jeff Gordon then hit Jeff Burton from behind, and both hit the wall. Gordon was spinning and was hit by Michael Waltrip as rain was coming down even more, Gordon's car was lying at the grass. The red flag came out once the rain was coming down hard. The drivers involved in the crash restarted the race with back-up cars. Harvick would be the only driver to not finish the race, only completing 19 laps.

Comeback and victory 

After the wreck, Jeff Gordon came back from the mayhem to win his third career All-Star race victory, tying Dale Earnhardt. Gordon led for 10 laps during the race and earned $515,000 for the win.

Race results 
24-Jeff Gordon
88-Dale Jarrett
20-Tony Stewart
18-Bobby Labonte
25-Jerry Nadeau
22-Ward Burton
8-Dale Earnhardt Jr.
66-Todd Bodine (Segment 2 winner)
10-Johnny Benson (Open Segment 1 winner)
55-Bobby Hamilton
5-Terry Labonte
12-Jeremy Mayfield
6-Mark Martin
17-Matt Kenseth
2-Rusty Wallace
99-Jeff Burton
9-Bill Elliott
21-Elliott Sadler
1-Steve Park
15-Michael Waltrip
29-Kevin Harvick

References

Winston, The
Winston, The
NASCAR races at Charlotte Motor Speedway
NASCAR All-Star Race